Association football is the most popular sport in France. The French Football Federation (FFF, Fédération Française de Football) is the national governing body and is responsible for overseeing all aspects of association football in the country, both professional and amateur. The federation organizes the Coupe de France and is responsible for appointing the management of the men's, women's and youth national football teams in France. The federation gives responsibility of Ligue 1 and Ligue 2 to the Ligue de Football Professionnel (LFP) who oversee, organize, and manage the country's top two leagues. The LFP is also responsible for organizing the Coupe de la Ligue, the country's league cup competition. The French Football Federation also supervises the overseas departments and territories leagues and hosts football club AS Monaco, a club based in the independent sovereign state of Monaco. In 2022, the FFF had 2.1 million licensees, 1.8 million players and 14,000 registered clubs.

The first football club was introduced to France in 1863, as described in a newspaper article by The Scotsman, which stated "A number of English gentlemen living in Paris have lately organised a football club... The football contests take place in the Bois de Boulogne, by permission of the authorities and surprise the French amazingly." Modern football was introduced nine years later in 1872 by English sailors playing in Le Havre in 1872.

League system

Ligue de Football Professionnel

The top two divisions of French football, Ligue 1 and Ligue 2, are governed by the Ligue de Football Professionnel. The league is responsible for organizing, overseeing and managing the top two leagues and is also responsible for the 46 professional football clubs that contest football in France (20 in Ligue 1, 20 in Ligue 2, and 6 in the Championnat National).

Ligue 1 is the French professional league for football clubs. It is the country's primary football competition and serves as the top division of the French football league system. Contested by 20 clubs, it operates on a system of promotion and relegation with Ligue 2. Ligue 1 is one of the top national leagues, currently ranked fifth in Europe behind the English Premier League, Spanish La Liga, German Bundesliga, and the Italian Serie A. Ligue 1 was inaugurated on 11 September 1932 under the name National before switching to Division 1 after a year of existence. The name lasted until 2002 before switching to its current name. The current champions of France are Paris Saint-Germain, who won their tenth title in 2022.

Ligue 2 is the second division of French football. Contested by 20 clubs, it operates on a system of promotion and relegation with the Championnat National. The league was created in 1934, a year after Ligue 1 and consisted of 23 clubs that were divided into two groups, Nord and Sud.

Championnat National
The Championnat National is the third division of French football. Though the league has several clubs that are members of the Ligue de Football Professionnel, it is not governed by the organization primarily because of the LFP's refusal to divide its profits into smaller shares, so they can collaborate with the many amateur clubs in the league to help them become professional. The French Football Federation moderates the league, which was founded in 1993 under the name National 1. Contested by 20 clubs, it operates on a system of promotion and relegation with the Championnat de France amateur.

Championnat National 2
The Championnat National 2 is the fourth division of French football and normally features 72 football clubs. Most clubs that participate in the league are amateur clubs, but a small number of clubs are semi-professional. The CFA consists of 72 clubs spread into 4 parallel groups of 18. It is open to the best reserve teams in France and amateur clubs in France, although only the amateur clubs are eligible for promotion to the Championnat National. The highest-placed amateur team in each pool are promoted, replaced by the 4 lowest-placed in the Championnat National.

Championnat National 3
The Championnat National 3 is the 5th division in French football and normally consists of 168 teams in 12 groups of 14 organised to align with the regional leagues. The twelve teams (both amateur and reserves of professional teams in higher divisions) that top their league are promoted to Championnat National 2. Relegation from Championnat National 3 is defined by both position in the group and the region the club belongs to. Normally, one club is relegated to each regional league that feeds that group.

Lower divisions
Some of regional leagues are organised and managed by the Ligue du Football Amateur. The LFA, under the watch of the French Football Federation, is responsible for administering and federating the actions of the regional and district leagues.

Women's football

Women's football in France consists of three divisions, Division 1 Féminine, Division 2 Féminine, and Division 3 Féminine. The D1 Féminine is the top league for women's association football clubs in France. It is the female equivalent to the men's Ligue 1 and is contested by 12 clubs. The league operates on a system of promotion and relegation with lower leagues and is governed by the French Football Federation, who resurrected the women's league in 1974.

Overseas leagues
The leagues based in the overseas departments and territories of France are run by their respective associations under the watch of the French Football Federation. Under the rules of the FFF, clubs in the leagues are allowed to participate in confederation competitions based on their regional locations. For example, the champion of the Réunion Premier League is allowed inclusion into the CAF Champions League.

Cup competitions

The most important cup competition in France is the Coupe de France. However, several other national cups are targeted at clubs at different levels.

The Coupe de France is the premier knockout cup competition in French football. It is open to all amateur and professional football clubs in France, including clubs based in the overseas departments and territories. The final is played at the Stade de France and, during the 2016–17 season, celebrated its 100th anniversary.
The Coupe de la Ligue was the second major cup competition in France. It was known outside France as the French League Cup and was a knockout league cup competition organised by the Ligue de Football Professionnel. Unlike the Coupe de France, it was only open to professional clubs who were members of the LFP. The competition was discontinued in 2020 to prevent fixture congestion.
The Trophée des Champions is played each July as a one-off match between the Coupe de France winners and the Ligue 1 champions.
Regional amateur leagues of France organise their own cup competitions that are run by the French Football Federation. For example, the Coupe Bourgogne only features amateur clubs that are based in the region of Burgundy.
Youth cups include the Coupe Gambardella, Coupe Nationale, and the Coupe Fédérale. The Coupe Gambardella cup competition held between the under-19s of the French football clubs. The Coupe Nationale holds dual competitions for the under-13 and under-15 teams of football clubs, while the Coupe Fédérale holds a national cup competition for under-16 teams.
The Coupe de l'Outre-Mer is a football cup competition that was created in 2008. It was designed to have the national football teams of the overseas territories compete against each other.
Women's football cup competitions in France consists of the Challenge de France, Coupe Nationale, and the Coupe Fédérale. The Challenge de France is the premier cup competition reserved exclusively for French women's football clubs. The competition is open to all professional and non-professional women's teams in the country. The Coupe National holds a youth cup competition for the under-14 teams, while the Coupe Fédérale holds cup competitions for the under-13 and under-16 teams.

Competition records

UEFA Champions League
The following teams have qualified for the last eight of the European Cup / UEFA Champions League.

Marseille (1989–90 – Semi-finals, 1990–91 – Runners-up, 1992–93 – Champions, 2011–12 – Quarter-finals)
Monaco (1993–94 – Semi-finals, 1997–98 – Semi-finals, 2003–04 – Runners-up, 2016–17 – Semi-finals)
Saint-Étienne (1974–75 – Semi-finals, 1975–76 – Runners-up, 1976–77 – Quarter-finals)
Lyon (2003–04 – Quarter-finals, 2004–05 – Quarter-finals, 2005–06 – Quarter-finals, 2009–10 – Semi-finals, 2019–20 – Semi-finals)
Reims (1955–56 – Runners-up, 1958–59 – Runners-up, 1962–63 – Quarter-finals)
Bordeaux (1984–85 – Semi-finals, 2009–10 – Quarter-finals)
Paris Saint-Germain (1994–95 – Semi-finals, 2012–13 – Quarter-finals, 2013–14 – Quarter-finals, 2015–16 – Quarter-finals, 2019–20 – Runners-up, 2020–21 – Semi-finals)
Nantes (1995–96 – Semi-finals)
Auxerre (1996–97 – Quarter-finals)

National teams

The France national football team represents France in international football. France was one of the four European teams that participated at the inaugural World Cup in 1930 and are one of eight national teams to have won the competition, which they did in 1998 when they hosted the Cup, defeating Brazil 3–0 in the final. They won their second world title 20 years later, after defeating Croatia 4–2 in the final of the 2018 edition in Russia. France also won two European Championships in 1984 and 2000, and hosted the tournament on three occasions, including their victorious 1984 campaign. Following France's 2001 Confederations Cup victory, they became the first national team to win the three most important men's titles organised by FIFA: the FIFA World Cup, the FIFA Confederations Cup, and the Olympic Tournament. This would be followed with Argentina and Brazil's victories at the Summer Olympics in 2004 and 2016. France additionally went on to win a UEFA Nations League title in 2021.

The France women's national football team represents the country in international women's football. The France women's national team initially struggled on the international stage failing to qualify for three of the first FIFA Women's World Cups and the six straight UEFA European Championships before reaching the quarter-finals in the 1997 edition of the competition. However, since the beginning of the new millennium, France have become a mid-tier national team and one of the most consistent in Europe, having qualified for their first-ever FIFA Women's World Cup in 2003 and reaching the quarter-finals in the last three consecutive European Championships. They also hosted the 2019 Women's World Cup, reaching the quarter-finals.

The France national youth football teams consists of age-specific national teams beginning with the France national under-16 football team and ending with the France national under-21 football team. Since the coaching tenure of Aimé Jacquet, there is an unwritten rule among senior national team coaches that players called up to the national team must have had prior international experience with the under-21 team.

Overseas departments national teams
The following overseas department national teams act as feeder teams for the France national football team. All teams are run by their respective federation under the authority of the French Football Federation.

As an overseas department of the French Republic, each national team is not a member of FIFA, therefore they are not eligible to enter the World Cup. However, since inhabitants of the overseas departments are French citizens, players are eligible to play for the France national football team. Guadeloupe, Martinique, Saint Martin, and French Guiana are associate members of CONCACAF and are full members of the Caribbean Football Union, and are thus eligible for all competitions organized by both, while Réunion are associate members of CAF. Indeed, according to the status of the FFF (article 34, paragraph 6): "[...]Under the control of related continental confederations, and with the agreement of the FFF, those leagues can organize international sport events at a regional level or set up teams in order to participate to them."

A special rule of the CONCACAF Gold Cup only allows players to join the team if they have not played for France during the previous five years. On the other hand, any player joining the team is allowed to join the France national team afterward with no time restrictions.

The use of overseas department players has been extremely beneficial for the France national team. Lilian Thuram and Bernard Lama, who were born in Guadeloupe and Martinique, respectively, were a part of the winning team at the 1998 FIFA World Cup. Also on the team were Thierry Henry and Bernard Diomède, who, though born in metropolitan France, were descendants of parents from overseas departments. Currently, Florent Malouda (French Guiana), William Gallas, Mikaël Silvestre, Michaël Ciani (Guadeloupe), Nicolas Anelka (Martinique), and Guillaume Hoarau and Florent Sinama Pongolle (Réunion) are members of the national team who either hail from or whose families hail from the overseas departments.

+40,000 capacity French football stadiums

See also

 Sport in France
 List of football stadiums in France

References

External links
 Official site